Vartun (also Romanized as Varţūn and Vartūn; also known as Varţān, Vartan, and Varūn) is a village in Sistan Rural District, Kuhpayeh District, Isfahan County, Isfahan Province, Iran. At the 2006 census, its population was 477, in 123 families.

References 

Populated places in Isfahan County